

Biography
Matthew Orr is a British investor and start up advisor living and working in the United States. In 1989 he co-founded Killik & Co., one of the United Kingdom's leading private client investment houses, and was its Managing Partner and Chief Executive until 2006. 
Orr is married to Sybil Robson Orr. Together they founded The Robson Orr TenTen Award  in 2018, which supports the Government Art Collection in selecting outstanding British artists to create original print works for the Collection to display around the world. Artists, including Hurvin Anderson, Tacita Dean, Yinka Shonibare CBE and Lubaina Himid have created original works for the Collection for TenTen. At the same time, annual sales from these prints sold through the Outset Contemporary Art Fund will raise funds so that the Collection can continue to acquire art by emerging artists in the UK.

In, 1996  Orr co-founded The Orr Mackintosh Foundation (ShareGift) with Claire Mackintosh. Sharegift allows small share holdings, which would be uneconomical to sell individually, to be donated to benefit charitable causes.  Orr and Mackintosh were awarded the  Beacon Fellowship Prize in 2006  for their work with Sharegift.

Orr co-founded The Money Channel in 1999 which is broadcast on Sky Digital. The TV channel’s aim was to provide financial advice to small investors on subjects including pension planning and investment in shares. The Money Channel shut down in 2002.

Membership
Orr was a personal member of the London Stock Exchange, and a director of stockbroking firm Quilter Goodison up until 1987. He is a former member of the ifs School of Finance Board of Governors, (The London Institute of Banking & Finance is a financial education charity providing financial qualifications from GCSE level through to master’s degrees) and a former chair of the ifs ProShare Faculty Board (replaced by an Advisory Board in 2007).
Orr is a former trustee of The Duff Cooper Prize, a literary prize awarded annually for the best work of history, biography, political science or occasionally poetry, published in English or French. The prize was established in honor of Duff Cooper, a British diplomat, Cabinet member and author.

References

English chief executives
Living people
Year of birth missing (living people)